Vaglaskógur is a 300-hectare forest in Fnjóskadalur, Iceland. It is the second largest forest area in the country. This area contains many birch trees and is a visitor attraction.

Gallery

References

External links

Protected areas of Iceland
Forests of Iceland